Farak or Fark or Fork may refer to:

 Farak, Komijan, Markazi Province
 Farak, Tafresh, Markazi Province
 Fark, Razavi Khorasan
 Fark, Yazd

See also
 Farg (disambiguation)
 FARK (disambiguation)